Wanderson Costa Viana (born February 7, 1994), commonly known as Wanderson, is a Brazilian professional footballer who plays as a winger for Doxa Drama.

Career
He played on loan for Doxa Dramas during the 2011–12 season.

On 29 June 2018, Wanderson signed with Bulgarian club Beroe.

References

External links

1994 births
Living people
Brazilian footballers
Brazilian expatriate footballers
Olympiacos F.C. players
Doxa Drama F.C. players
Cape Town Spurs F.C. players
Apollon Smyrnis F.C. players
PAS Lamia 1964 players
PFC Beroe Stara Zagora players
Iwate Grulla Morioka players
Super League Greece players
Football League (Greece) players
South African Premier Division players
First Professional Football League (Bulgaria) players
J3 League players
Association football wingers
Footballers from Brasília
Brazilian expatriate sportspeople in Greece
Brazilian expatriate sportspeople in South Africa
Brazilian expatriate sportspeople in Bulgaria
Brazilian expatriate sportspeople in Japan
Expatriate footballers in Greece
Expatriate soccer players in South Africa
Expatriate footballers in Bulgaria
Expatriate footballers in Japan